Henry Christian Hopman CBE (12 August 1906 – 27 December 1985) was an Australian tennis player and coach.

Early life
Harry Hopman was born on 12 August 1906 in Glebe, Sydney as the third child of John Henry Hopman, a schoolteacher, and Jennie Siberteen, née Glad. His family then moved to Parramatta.

Hopman started playing tennis at the age of 13 and, playing barefoot, won an open singles tournament on a court in the playground of Rosehill Public School where his father was headmaster. He was later a student at Parramatta High School where he played tennis and cricket.

Davis Cup

Hopman was the successful captain-coach of 22 Australian Davis Cup teams from 1939 to 1967. With players such as Frank Sedgman, Ken McGregor, Lew Hoad, Ken Rosewall, Rod Laver, Neale Fraser, John Newcombe, Fred Stolle, Tony Roche, Roy Emerson, Ashley Cooper, Rex Hartwig, Mervyn Rose and Mal Anderson, he won the cup an unmatched 16 times.

In late 1951, when it appeared that Davis Cup player Frank Sedgman was about to turn professional, Hopman used his column in the Melbourne Herald to lead a fundraising campaign designed to keep Sedgman in the amateur ranks. Enough money was raised to purchase a gasoline station in the name of Sedgman's wife-to-be and Sedgman remained an amateur for one more year. As Joe McCauley writes in The History of Professional Tennis, "For some reason, the pious Hopman, a strong opponent of the paid game, did not regard this as an infringement of Sedgman's amateur status."

Journalism

Hopman was also a journalist, joining the Melbourne Herald in 1933 as a sportswriter. He provided sporting commentary. After World War II, this became his focus until he was once again coaxed into tennis coaching. As an example of Hopman's journalism, Kramer writes that Sedgman, by then a successful touring professional, once "volunteered to help train the Aussie Davis Cup team. Hopman accepted the offer, and then he took Sedg aside and told him that what Hoad and Rosewall needed was confidence. So he told Sedg to go easy on them, which he gladly did. After a few days, Hopman wrote an exclusive in his newspaper column revealing how his kids could whip Sedgman and how this proved once again that amateurs were better than the pros."

Legacy
The Hopman Cup was named in his honour. Until her death in mid-2018, his widow Lucy Hopman travelled to Perth, Western Australia each year for the tournament.

Hopman was inducted into the International Tennis Hall of Fame in Newport, Rhode Island, in 1978.

Tennis great Jack Kramer, who was also a successful promoter of the professional tour, writes in his 1979 autobiography that Hopman "always knew exactly what was going on with all his amateurs. He had no children, no hobbies, and tennis was everything to him. Hopman always said he hated the pros, and he battled open tennis to the bitter end, but as early as the time when Sedgman and McGregor signed, Hopman was trying to get himself included in the deal so he could get a job with pro tennis in America."

Kramer, who admits that Hopman "has never been my favorite guy", goes on to say: "The minute one of his stars would turn pro, Hopman would turn on him. No matter how close he'd been to a player, as soon as he was out of Hopman's control, the guy was an outcast. 'It was as if we'd never existed' Rosewall said once."

Personal life
Hopman was first married to Nell Hall, with whom he won four mixed doubles finals. The marriage took place on 19 March 1934 at St Philip's Anglican Church in Sydney. She died of an intracranial tumour on 10 January 1968. Hopman emigrated to the United States in 1969 and became a successful professional coach, at Port Washington Tennis Academy, of future champions such as Vitas Gerulaitis and later John McEnroe. Hopman later opened the Harry Hopman's International Tennis camp in Treasure Island then Largo, Florida, with his second wife, Lucy Pope Fox, whom he married on 2 February 1971.

He was appointed Member of the Order of the British Empire (MBE) in the 1951 New Year Honours for services to sport, and promoted to Commander of the Order (CBE) in the 1956 New Year Honours, again for services to sport (particularly tennis).

Hopman died of a heart attack on 27 December 1985.

Tournament record

Australia Davis Cup

Player
 1928, 1930, 1932

Captain
 1938–1939, 1950–1969
 Winner: 1939, 1950–1953, 1955–1957, 1959–1962, 1964–1967
Runner-up: 1938, 1954, 1958, 1963, 1968

Italian Championship
 Mixed Doubles 1934

Grand Slam finals

Singles: 3 (3 runner-ups)

Doubles: 7 (2 titles, 5 runner-ups)

Mixed doubles: 8 (5 titles, 3 runner-ups)

References

Sources
 The Game, My 40 Years in Tennis (1979), Jack Kramer with Frank Deford
 The History of Professional Tennis (2003), Joe McCauley
 Rich Hillway, tennis historian

Further reading

External links

 
 
 
 
 
 Parramatta High School biography 

Australian Championships (tennis) champions
Australian expatriate sportspeople in the United States
Australian male tennis players
Australian tennis coaches
Australian Commanders of the Order of the British Empire
Tennis players from Sydney
International Tennis Hall of Fame inductees
United States National champions (tennis)
1906 births
1985 deaths
People from Parramatta
Grand Slam (tennis) champions in mixed doubles
Grand Slam (tennis) champions in men's doubles
Grand Slam (tennis) champions in boys' doubles
Australian Championships (tennis) junior champions
People educated at Parramatta High School
Sport Australia Hall of Fame inductees
20th-century Australian people
Sportsmen from New South Wales